Hulikal Ramaiengar Krishnamurthy (born 1951) is an Indian theoretical physicist. He specializes in theoretical condensed matter physics, especially quantum many-body theory and statistical physics. He was the chairman of the Department of Physics, Indian Institute of Science. His most well-known work is titled Renormalization Group Approach to the Anderson Model of Dilute Magnetic Alloys.

Biography 

Krishnamurthy obtained his BSc (Hons) in Physics (1970) from Bangalore University and MSc (Physics) (1972) from IIT, Kanpur. He studied in Cornell University (1972–76) as an IBM fellow, working with Kenneth G. Wilson and John W. Wilkins. In his PhD thesis, he extended Wilson's numerical renormalization group solution for the Kondo problem to the symmetric Anderson impurity model. The extension to the asymmetric case was completed during his post-doctoral tenure (1976–78) at the University of Illinois. Krishnamurthy returned to India and joined the Department of Physics, IISc, Bangalore (1978) and became a Professor (1996). He has held sabbatical positions at Princeton University, Harvard University, Ohio State University, University of Cincinnati, UC Davis and Georgetown University.

References 

1951 births
Living people
Cornell University alumni
Indian condensed matter physicists
Academic staff of the Indian Institute of Science
Bangalore University alumni